Mieczyslaw Pianowski was a Polish-American dancer, choreographer, ballet director, and ballet teacher.  He was a soloist in Anna Pavlova's company, and he was her ballet master for 13 years.

Career
Pianowski received his early training at the Warsaw Ballet School in Warsaw, Poland. From 1905 to 1915, he danced with the Warsaw Grand Opera Theater Ballet Company, where he was the main dancer. In 1915, Pianowski went under contract with Sergei Diaghilev's Ballet Russe and remained with the troupe for about 3 years. Pianowski's wife, Sabina, accompanied him while he toured with the Ballet Russe.

Pianowski met Ana Pavlova in 1918 while touring with the Italian Opera Company in Santiago Chile. It was said that Pavlova was impressed by him, and he subsequently became a soloist and assistant in her company. He later became chief ballet master until the company fell apart after Pavlova's death in 1931.
After Pavlova's death, Pianowski went to Yugoslavia, then in 1931 he became a director of ballet and choreographer of the opera and ballet in Riga, Latvia for two years. He staged six ballets in Latvia, and developed dances for several operas.  In 1934, he returned to Poland where, in 1935, he was offered the position of ballet master at the Warsaw Grand Opera Theater, and also the director of the Warsaw Ballet School.  
In 1952, Pianowski ran his own ballet studio in Boston.  He later moved to Amarillo, Texas, and taught at the Musical Arts Conservatory in Amarillo.

Early life
Pianowski was born January 1, 1890, in Warsaw, Poland, to Jan Pianowski and Jozffa Skrzypinska. Pianowski's father, Jan, was a merchant, and owned a delicatessen shop where they lived in an apartment above the shop. He had two siblings, Henry and Helen. 
He began his ballet training at age 6, when his father took him to an audition at the Warsaw Grand Opera Theatre ballet company. The ballet master accepted him into the school, even though he was a year too young. About 12 years later when he was ready to graduate, he had to stay in school an extra year because he was too young to be accepted as a member of the company. But, a year later, he became a soloist with the Warsaw Grand Opera 
To supplement his income while dancing, he took a job as a teacher at an all-girls school, where he met his wife Sabina. 
They married after Sabina's graduation in Switzerland where she had begun to study medicine.

Invasion of Poland
In 1939, Sabina was living in the couple's country home in northern Poland with their son Jorge, who was about 16 at the time, while Pianowski lived and worked in Warsaw.
Every Saturday after Pianowski's performance, he would return to his wife and son there.
In 1939 the Germans invaded Poland, the opera house was bombed and Pianowski was taken to a concentration camp in Germany where he was forced to labor in a munitions factory.
 Because they were in Northern Poland at the time, his wife and son didn’t know that he had been taken by the Germans, and were unaware of his plight.  When the Russians came from the North, Pianowski's wife and son were put on a train to Siberia. 
After a year, Jorge was given a chance to leave Siberia if he joined the Polish army and fight for Russia.  He did so, and eventually made a career in the British army.  Jorge didn't see his parents again until 1967. In 1947 Sabina was returned to her native Poland, where she spent three months in a Red Cross hospital.  In 1945, Pianowski was freed by the American army In 1946 he was released from the German work camp, but he declined to go back to Poland. Instead, he went to a displaced persons camp, where he lived in an American sector of Germany.

In the late 1940’s, a ballet patroness in Boston learned of Pianowski’s troubles and arranged for him to go to Boston and direct the Boston Ballet Center
In 1952, Pianowski went to Amarillo Texas to head the ballet school at the Musical Arts Conservatory
In 1956 Pianowski became an American citizen.
On July 16, 1958, Pianowski was reunited with his wife thanks to the efforts of Neil and Camille Hess in Amarillo. In 1958 Pianowski and Sabina moved to Seattle for Sabina’s health. In 1962  Neill Hess received a letter from Pianowski's doctor saying that Pianowski had cancer, so Neil Hess and his wife rented an apartment for the Pianowskis and brought them back to Amarillo.
Pianowski and his wife were reunited with their son Jorge in Amarillo, Texas, one week before Pianowski passed away.

Personal life
Pianowki married Sabina Sniezko-Blocka who was born 1895 in Minsk, USSR. Sabina's father and grandfather were physicians. She had 7 brothers Pianowski had one son, Jorge, who was born in Bergenfield, New Jersey in 1921. Jorge became a sergeant for the British Army Reserve. Jorge married, and had five sons. 
Pianowski lost his mementos from his time with Pavlova and the rest of his career due to the burning of the theater in Warsaw

Death
Pianowski died March 30, 1967, of cancer. 
He is buried at the Llano Cemetery in Amarillo, Texas.
His wife Sabina died October 31, 1972, in Panhandle, Texas, and is buried at the Panhandle cemetery. 
Pianowski’s son Jorge died in 1971 in a plane crash.

References

External links
 Pianowski's headstone
  Pianowski and Neill Hess in 1957
 Pianowski with Pavlova
  Pianowski with Pavlova in Australia

Ballet teachers
Artistic directors
1890 births
1967 deaths
Ballets Russes dancers
Polish emigrants to the United States
Male ballet dancers